Sif Vaya is a populated place situated in Pinal County, Arizona, United States. Over the years it has also been known as Bitter Well, Bitter Wells, Bitters Well, and Sivvaxia. Sif Vaya, which means bitter well in O'odham, became the official name as a result of a decision by the Board on Geographic Names in 1941.

References

Populated places in Pinal County, Arizona